The Shenyang–Jilin Expressway, commonly referred to as the Shenji Expressway is an expressway that connects the cities of Shenyang, Liaoning, China, and Jilin City, Jilin. It is a spur of G12 Hunchun–Ulanhot Expressway.

Detailed Itinerary

References

Chinese national-level expressways
Transport in Shenyang
Expressways in Jilin
Expressways in Liaoning